Albert Murray may refer to:

 Albert Murray (artist) (1906–1992), American naval combat artist
 Albert Murray (writer) (1916–2013), American literary and music critic, novelist, essayist, and biographer
 Albert Murray (golfer), English-born Canadian golfer
 Albert Murray, Baron Murray of Gravesend (1930–1980), British Labour Party politician, Member of Parliament 1964– 1970
 Bert Murray (born 1942), English football player